Kareem Walker (born May 18, 1998) is an American football running back for the St. Louis BattleHawks of the XFL. He attended the University of Michigan on a scholarship to play college football for the Michigan Wolverines football team starting during the 2016 season, but left the team in 2018.  Walker played as a true freshman at Michigan, then took a redshirt year before transferring to Fort Scott Community College in Kansas in 2018. He played for Mississippi State from 2019 to 2020 and South Alabama in 2021.

High school career
Walker played high school football at DePaul Catholic High School in Wayne, New Jersey. He gained 4,563 rushing yards and scored 57 touchdowns during his high school career, including 1,607 yards and 27 touchdowns as a junior in 2014 and 1,517 yards and 14 touchdowns as a senior in 2015. In July 2014, he was rated by ESPN and 247Sports.com as the No. 1 running back in the class of 2016.  He was rated as a four-star prospect by ESPN.com and the No. 45 overall player in the 2016 ESPN 300.

College career
Walker originally committed to Ohio State, during halftime of the 2015 National Championship Game, but withdrew his commitment in November 2015.  The following month, he committed to the University of Michigan.  Walker enrolled early in January 2016, announced his intention to play as a freshman and added: "But I'm not riding the bench. I came in to be ready." In July 2018, Walker transferred to play at Fort Scott Community College in Kansas.

Walker played for Mississippi State from 2019 to 2020 and South Alabama in 2021.

Professional career
Walker was assigned to the St. Louis BattleHawks of the XFL on January 6, 2023.

References

External links
 Michigan Wolverines bio

1998 births
Living people
DePaul Catholic High School alumni
Players of American football from New Jersey
American football running backs
Michigan Wolverines football players
Fort Scott Greyhounds football players
Mississippi State Bulldogs football players
South Alabama Jaguars football players
St. Louis BattleHawks players